George Anthony "Whitey" Rohe (September 15, 1874 – June 10, 1957) was an infielder in Major League Baseball from 1901 to 1907. He played for the Baltimore Orioles and Chicago White Sox. Rohe was the surprise hitting star of the 1906 World Series for the Chicago White Sox, batting .333 (7-21) with a double, 2 triples, and 4 RBIs. His bases loaded triple scored 3 runs in the White Sox 3-0 victory in Game 3 of the series. His timely hitting throughout the series helped the White Sox defeat the powerful Cubs in 6 games. By 1908 he was out of major league baseball. He is buried in Cincinnati's Walnut Hills Cemetery.

References

External links

1874 births
1957 deaths
Major League Baseball infielders
Baltimore Orioles (1901–02) players
Chicago White Sox players
Baseball players from Cincinnati
Minor league baseball managers
Grand Rapids Cabinet Makers players
Mobile Blackbirds players
Danville Champions players
Minneapolis Millers (baseball) players
St. Joseph Saints players
New Orleans Pelicans (baseball) players
Mobile Sea Gulls players
Montgomery Rebels players
Newnan Cowetas players